The 1999 season was the Minnesota Vikings' 39th in the National Football League (NFL). After going a near perfect 15–1 record in 1998, the Vikings began the 1999 season with high expectations of another great season. Randall Cunningham resumed duties again in 1999, but after a struggling 2–4 start to the season, he was benched and Jeff George was given the starting job as quarterback.

George finished the season with an 8–2 record, and led the Vikings into the postseason once again, with an overall team record of 10–6 failing to match their record from the 1998 season. Minnesota beat the Dallas Cowboys in the Wild Card Game 27–10 and faced playoff newcomer Kurt Warner and the St. Louis Rams in the Divisional Round. The game was a shootout which Minnesota led 17–14 at halftime, but the Rams outscored Minnesota 35 to 20 in the second half to win 49–37. St. Louis would then go on to win Super Bowl XXXIV against the Titans.

Offseason

1999 Expansion Draft

1999 Draft

 The Vikings traded QB Brad Johnson to the Washington Redskins in exchange for Washington's first- and third-round selections (11th and 73rd overall), and second-round selection in 2000.
 The Vikings traded their second- and fifth-round selections (59th and 163rd overall), and the third-round selection they acquired from the Washington Redskins (73rd overall) to the Pittsburgh Steelers in exchange for Pittsburgh's second-round selection (44th overall).
 The Vikings traded their third-round selection (91st overall) to the New England Patriots in exchange for CB Jimmy Hitchcock.
 The Vikings received Miami's fourth-round selection (120th overall) as compensation for restricted free agent TE Hunter Goodwin.
 The Vikings traded OL Everett Lindsay to the Baltimore Ravens in exchange for the sixth-round selection Baltimore acquired from Tampa Bay (185th overall).

Preseason

Regular season

Schedule

Game summaries

Week 1: at Atlanta Falcons

Week 2: vs. Oakland Raiders

Week 3: at Green Bay Packers

Week 4: vs. Tampa Bay Buccaneers

Week 5: vs. Chicago Bears

Week 6: at Detroit Lions

Week 7: vs. San Francisco 49ers

Week 8: at Denver Broncos

Week 9: vs. Dallas Cowboys

Week 10: at Chicago Bears

Week 12: vs. San Diego Chargers

Week 13: at Tampa Bay Buccaneers

Week 14: at Kansas City Chiefs

Week 15: vs. Green Bay Packers

Week 16: at New York Giants

Week 17: vs. Detroit Lions

Standings

Postseason

Schedule

Game summaries

NFC Wild Card Round: vs (#5) Dallas Cowboys

NFC Divisional Round: vs (#1) St. Louis Rams

Statistics

Team leaders

League rankings

Staff

Roster

References

Minnesota Vikings seasons
Minnesota
Minnesota